Ambohipihaonana is a rural municipality in Madagascar. It belongs to the district of Ambohidratrimo (district), which is a part of Analamanga Region. The population of the municipality was 5703 inhabitants.

References 

Populated places in Analamanga